Potassium picrate, or potassium 2,4,6-trinitrophenolate, is an organic chemical, a picrate of potassium. It is a reddish yellow or green crystalline material. It is a primary explosive. Anhydrous potassium picrate forms orthorhombic crystals.

History 
Potassium picrate was first prepared as impure in mid-17th century by Johann Rudolf Glauber by dissolving wood in nitric acid and neutralizing with potassium carbonate. It is commonly made by neutralizing picric acid by potassium carbonate. It was used since 1860s. Its chief applications are in pyrotechnics, in some whistle mixes, as a component of explosives (with potassium nitrate and charcoal), propellants (with the same substances in the poudre Dessignole of the 1870s French Navy, or potassium chlorate currently), and explosive primers (with lead picrate and potassium chlorate).

Description 
Potassium picrate is not a very powerful explosive. It is somewhat shock-sensitive. In contact with flame it deflagrates with a loud sound. If ignited in confined space, it will detonate. It is more sensitive than picric acid. 

In contact with metals (e.g. lead, calcium, iron), potassium picrate, like ammonium picrate and picric acid, forms picrates of said metals. These are often more dangerous and more sensitive explosives. Contact with such materials therefore should be prevented.

Potassium picrate is used to determine the concentration of nonionic surfactants in water; materials detectable by this method are called potassium picrate active substances (PPAS).

Synthesis 
As with other picrates, potassium picrate may be produced by the neutralization of picric acid with the corresponding carbonate.
As picric acid is barely soluble in water the reaction must be done in an appropriate solvent like methanol.
First dissolving the picric acid in methanol and then adding potassium carbonate will result in potassium picrate. Temperature control is important to prevent detonation or excessive methanol evaporation.

Sensitivity 
According to Urbanski, Potassium picrate detonated 10% of the time when struck by a mass of 2kg dropped from the height of 21cm.
By comparison, the more sensitive anhydrous lead picrate detonated 10% of the time when struck by the same mass dropped from the height of 2cm.

See also 
 Dunnite
 Picric acid
 Lead picrate

References 
  
 Urbanski, Tadeusz (1964), Chemistry and Technology of Explosives, Volume 1, New York: Pergamon Press.

Picrates
Potassium compounds
Explosive chemicals